Eduard Grandisson (1798 – 26 April 1879) was a colonial administrator in the Dutch East Indies, who served as opperhoofd of the trading post of Dejima in the harbour of Nagasaki between 1838 and 1842.

Biography 
Eduard Grandisson was born to Ma Isa and adopted at a young age by Adriaan Wilbert Jorisen and Frederica Florentina Foeijt. It is likely his adoptive parents named him after the character of the same name in the popular Dutch children's novel of the day, De kleine Grandisson, of de gehoorzaame zoon by Maria Geertruid de Cambon-van der Werken.

Grandisson joined the colonial government of the Dutch East Indies, becoming adjunct procurator fiscal in Batavia, and later secretary of the residency of Palembang.

He married Johanna Carolina Wiltenaer in 1823. After her death in June 1838, he accepted the position of opperhoofd of the trading post of Dejima in Japan, where he succeeded . He served until 1842 and returned to the Dutch East Indies after. He was pensioned two years later and settled as a retired colonial administrator in Banten, where he founded a tea plantation with the name Nipon.

He died in Serang, Banten on 26 April 1879.

Personal life 
With Johanna Carolina Wiltenaer he had one daughter that survived infancy, Louise Hermenie Cornelie Grandisson (1831–1860). A son, Johan Eduard Grandisson (1835–1836), died within ten months after his birth. On 12 May 1873, Eduard Grandisson married Augustina Martha Tjoa Nio.

Notes

References 
 

1798 births
1879 deaths
Dutch chiefs of factory in Japan